The Historic Moravian Bethlehem Historic District encompasses a complex of the oldest surviving buildings in Bethlehem, Pennsylvania.  The National Historic Landmark District is a subset of the larger Central Bethlehem Historic District which is specifically focused on the early buildings constructed by the Moravians who settled the city in the 18th century.  The district was designated a National Historic Landmark in 2012 for its unique assemblage of communal religious buildings and history. In 2016 it was named to the U.S. Tentative List for nomination to the World Heritage List.

Description and history

The Historic Moravian Bethlehem Historic District occupies a discontiguous  area of central Bethlehem.  Its central core consists of the Moravian Museum of Bethlehem and adjacent properties, located at Main and West Church Streets east of Monocacy Creek which is a tributary of Lehigh River in Northampton County. The museum property includes a connected series of 18th-century stone buildings which includes the 1744-1772 Single Sisters' House and the 1746 Bell House, both of which served as communal living facilities, and the 1751 Old Chapel. Also part of the complex, the 1741 Gemeinhaus, (Also known as the Lewis David de Schweinitz Residence or the Moravian Museum of Bethlehem) is a National Historic Landmark for its association with botanist and mycologist Lewis David de Schweinitz who used to take up residence in the building.  The museum also manages properties near the creek, including the industrial 1761 Tannery building, and the 1762 Waterworks (also known as Old Waterworks), which is also a National Historic Landmark as the first pump-driven North American municipal water supply.  This area, known as the Colonial Industrial Quarter, is also archaeologically significant, as the early Moravians developed it industrially from an early period. Non-museum properties include the 1803-06 Central Moravian Church, the God's Acre (Moravian burial ground), and the 1758-60 Moravian Sun Inn, located further up Main Street. Sun Inn was created as a place for non Moravian people to take up residence while they did any sort of business with the people that lived in the town. The Sun Inn was used often during the American Revolution. It was used by a few important people in history such as George Washington, Martha Washington, Benjamin Franklin, Samuel Adams, John Hancock and John Adams.

Bethlehem was settled in 1741, and was the first successful community established by German Moravian Church adherents in North America.  It consequently became a central point for later Moravian settlements across what is now the eastern United States.  Because some of its earliest communal buildings were built in stone, they have survived the subsequent history of the city.  These buildings house the community's single men and women (segregated by sex), and served as its early places of worship (the Gemeinhaus).  Bethlehem remained under strong Moravian religious influence until the early 19th century, when the community began to become more secular. One of the living facilities segregated by sex in this area was called the Single Sisters' House and it is a place where single Moravian women would live before they were married or after they were widowed. There were three significant additions to the Sisters House after it was built. The original version of the Single Sisters' House was built in 1744 and was a two-story stone building that lacked a basement and a kitchens. Then there was the second version  of the Sisters' House which was when a Northern Wing was added to the Sisters' House. The Northern Wing included a few new changes to building which were a new dormitory a larger dining area and in the later future a chapel. The next addition that was made was the last addition made to the building. The addition included a building that was raised above the building on a basement and it was the first time that architectural detail was included in a Moravian building. The Single Sisters' House is located on West Church Street near the Bethlehem Public Library. The Single Brethens' House was a building that served the same purpose except it was a place where single and widowed Moravian men would live. The Single Brethens' House is located on Main Street.

See also
List of National Historic Landmarks in Pennsylvania
National Register of Historic Places listings in Northampton County, Pennsylvania
Central Bethlehem Historic District

References

External links

 Official website

Bethlehem, Pennsylvania
Historic districts in Northampton County, Pennsylvania
Historic districts on the National Register of Historic Places in Pennsylvania
National Register of Historic Places in Northampton County, Pennsylvania